Trichodrymonia lacera, formerly Paradrymonia lacera, is a species of plant in the family Gesneriaceae endemic to Ecuador.  Its natural habitat is subtropical or tropical moist montane forests.  Though possibly extinct in the wild, but has been cultivated.

References

 Kvist, Lars Peter, Laurence E.Skog, John L. Clark, & Richard W. Dunn. "The family Gesneriaceae as example for the Biological extinction in Western Ecuador.." Lyonia 6(2004): 127–151.

Gesnerioideae
Endemic flora of Ecuador
Endangered plants
Taxonomy articles created by Polbot
Taxobox binomials not recognized by IUCN